"The Lumberjack" is a single by Canadian country music artist Hal Willis. The song peaked at number 1 on the RPM Country Tracks chart. It also reached number 5 on the Billboard Hot Country Singles chart in the United States.

Chart performance

References

Songs about occupations
1964 singles
Hal Willis (singer) songs
Quality Records singles
1964 songs